Vahtra is an Estonian surname relating derived from vahtralised, meaning  Aceraceae. People bearing the surname Vahtra include: 
Cristel Vahtra (born 1972), Estonian cross-country skier
Tuuli Vahtra (born 1989), Estonian chess Master

Estonian-language surnames